Athens is the capital of Greece.

Athens may also refer to:

Relating to Athens, Greece
 Classical Athens, the city in Classical Antiquity
 Duchy of Athens (1205-1458), Crusader State centered around the city
 Municipality of Athens
 Athens A and Athens B, parliamentary constituencies 
 Athens Prefecture (1987–2010)
 Central Athens (regional unit) (created 2011)
 Athens Exchange, the stock exchange 
 Athens University of Economics and Business
 National and Kapodistrian University of Athens, or simply the University of Athens

Places

Canada
 Athens, Ontario

Greece
Athenae Diades, a town of ancient Euboea
Athenae (Boeotia), a town of ancient Boeotia

Turkey
Athenae (Pontus), a city of ancient Pontus

United States
 Athens, Alabama
 Athens, Arkansas
 Athens, California
 Athens, Georgia
 Athens, Illinois
 Athens, Indiana
 Athens, Kentucky
 Athens, Louisiana
 Athens, Maine
 Athens, Michigan
 Athens, Mississippi
 Athens, Missouri
 Athens, Nevada
 Athens, New York
 Athens (village), New York
 Athens, Ohio
 Athens County, Ohio
 Athens, Pennsylvania, a borough
 Athens, Tennessee
 Athens, Texas
 Athens, Vermont
 Athens, West Virginia
 Athens, Wisconsin

Elsewhere
 Pontic Athens, a city on the Black Sea mentioned in the 2nd century

Other uses
 Athens (typeface)
 ATHENS Programme, an exchange network of European higher education institutions
 Lonnie Athens (fl. from 1992), American criminologist
 OpenAthens, an access and identity management service, previously known as Athens

See also 
 Athen (disambiguation)
 Atena (disambiguation)
 Atina (disambiguation)
 Athena (disambiguation)
 Athene (disambiguation)
 Altena (disambiguation)
 Athens Township (disambiguation)
 Athina (disambiguation)
 Afini
 ʻAtenisi Institute ('Athens Institute), in Tonga
 Athens Drive High School, in North Carolina, U.S.